"V" Is for Viagra. The Remixes is a remix album by Puscifer, a side project of Maynard James Keenan, which was released on April 29, 2008. It contains ten remixes of tracks from the first Puscifer album "V" Is for Vagina, as well as two remixes of the non-album single "Cuntry Boner".

In November 2008, "Indigo Children" (JLE Dub Mix) and "Momma Sed" (Tandemonium Mix) appeared on the official soundtrack for the video game Need for Speed: Undercover.

An additional track, "Lighten Up, Francis" (JLE Dub Mix) appears on the official soundtrack to the film Underworld: Rise of the Lycans.

"V" Is for Viagra has sold 23,000 copies.

Track listing

References

Puscifer remix albums
2008 remix albums
Self-released albums